The 2016 VTB United League Playoffs was the deciding play-off tournament that decided the champion of the 2015–16 VTB United League season. The eight teams that finished highest in the regular season were qualified. The Playoffs started on April 29 and ended on June 8, 2016.Schedule VTB League The champions or runners-up of the Playoffs would qualify for the 2016–17 EuroLeague, dependent on the position of automatically placed CSKA Moscow. CSKA Moscow won the championship, after beating runners-up UNICS that qualified for the EuroLeague as runners-up.

Bracket

Quarterfinals
In the quarterfinals, teams play against each other which must win three games to win the series. Thus, if one team win three games before all five games have been played, the game that remain are omitted. The team that finished in the higher Regular season place will be played the first, third and fifth (if it is necessary) game of the series at home.

Semifinals
In the semifinals, teams play against each other which must win three games to win the series. Thus, if one team win three games before all five games have been played, the game that remain are omitted. The team that finished in the higher Regular season place will be played the first, third and fifth (if it is necessary) game of the series at home.

Finals
In the Finals, teams play against each other which must win three games to win the series. Thus, if one team win three games before all five games have been played, the game that remain are omitted. The team that finished in the higher Regular season place will be played the first, third and fifth (if it is necessary) game of the series at home.

Game 1

Game 2

Game 3

Game 4

References

Playoffs
2016
2015–16 in Russian basketball
2015–16 in Czech basketball